Clifton-on-Yore is a civil parish in the Hambleton district of North Yorkshire, England.  The population of the parish was estimated at 40 in 2010. The population remained less than 100 as taken at the 2011 Census. Details were included in the civil parish of Thirn.

Clifton Castle
In parkland by the River Ure is Clifton Castle, a 19th-century country house on the site of a 14th-century castle of the Scrope family, of which a piece of walling survives.

The house is built in ashlar with stone slate roofs to an essentially T-shaped plan with a two-storey, 5-bay main block at right angles to a 3-storey, 5-bay service wing. At the front the central 3 bays have 4 large Ionic columns supporting a frieze and pediment.

The estate was purchased in 1735 from the Preston family by Timothy Hutton of Marske, who demolished the castle and commissioned John Foss to build the present Grecian style house in 1802. Hutton was High Sheriff of Yorkshire for 1844. On his death without heirs in 1863 the Clifton estate passed to his barrister cousin James Pulleine, who was High Sheriff for 1870. His only daughter Georgina married Major-General Sir John Clayton Cowell, Master of the Queen's Household. Sir John died in 1894 and his widow continued to live at the house. Their son Albert Victor succeeded them.

The estate was then purchased around 1970 by the 8th Marquess of Downshire and passed down to his son, Nick, 9th Marquess of Downshire, who lives there with his family Janey, Isabella, Beatrice, Edmund and Claudia.

References

Civil parishes in North Yorkshire
Country houses in North Yorkshire